Zhou Tong (Chinese: 周通; born 12 January 1990) is a Chinese professional football player who currently plays for Auckland City FC.

Club career
Zhou started his senior career with China League Two side Shijiazhuang Tiangong in 2008. He moved to another League Two club Dalian Aerbin in 2009. He became the key player of the club, helping Dalian Aerbin win two successive championships as the team won promotion into Chinese Super League.
He scored his first CSL goal on 24 March 2012, in a 3-3 away draw against Shandong Luneng Taishan.

On 11 July 2015, Zhou transferred to Chinese Super League side Tianjin Teda. He made his debut on 12 August 2015 in a 1–1 away draw against Shijiazhuang Ever Bright, coming on for Yuan Weiwei in the 61st minute.

On 2 February 2018, Zhou transferred to China League One side Wuhan Zall. He would be an integral member of the squad and help gain promotion to the top tier for the club by winning the 2018 China League One division.

On 6 March 2023, Zhou joined Auckland City in the New Zealand Football Championship.

Career statistics
Statistics accurate as of match played 31 December 2020.

Honours

Club
Dalian Aerbin
 China League Two: 2010
 China League One: 2011

Wuhan Zall
 China League One: 2018

References

External links
Player profile at Sodasoccer.com
 

1990 births
Living people
Sportspeople from Zibo
Association football midfielders
Chinese footballers
Chinese expatriate footballers
Footballers from Shandong
Dalian Professional F.C. players
Tianjin Jinmen Tiger F.C. players
Wuhan F.C. players
Auckland City FC players
Chinese Super League players
China League One players
China League Two players
New Zealand Football Championship players
Expatriate association footballers in New Zealand